is a railway station in the city of Motosu, Gifu Prefecture, Japan, operated by the private railway operator Tarumi Railway.

Lines

Station layout
Morera-Gifu Station has one ground-level side platform serving a single bi-directional track. The station is unattended.

Adjacent stations

History
Morera-Gifu Station opened on April 21, 2006.

Surrounding area

 Malera Gifu shopping center

See also
 List of Railway Stations in Japan

References

External links

 

Railway stations in Gifu Prefecture
Railway stations in Japan opened in 2006
Stations of Tarumi Railway
Motosu, Gifu